This is a list of the first minority male lawyer(s) and judge(s) in New Jersey. It includes the year in which the men were admitted to practice law (in parentheses). Also included are other distinctions such as the first minority men in their state to graduate from law school or become a political figure.

Firsts in New Jersey's history

Lawyers 

 First African American male: George Jackson (1893): First African American male lawyer in New Jersey
 First Deferred Action for Childhood Arrivals-recipient male (Indian descent): Parthiv Patel (2018)

State judges 

 First African American male: Roger M. Yancey in 1960  
 First Latino American male: John J. Dios during the 1970s 
 First Asian American male: Randolph M. Subryan in 1993  
 First openly gay male (municipal court): Albert J. Mrozik Jr. in 1993  
 First African American male (New Jersey Supreme Court): James H. Coleman Jr. in 1994 
 First Hispanic American male (New Jersey Supreme Court): Roberto A. Rivera-Soto in 2004  
 First Arab American male (superior court): Hany Mawla (1998) in 2010  
 First Indian American male: Sohail Mohammed (1993) in 2011  
 First Latino American male (assignment judge): Julio Mendez in 2011  
 First Palestinian American male: Abdel Majid Abdel Hadi in 2019  
 First Native American (Cherokee Nation) male: Joshua David Sanders in 2021  
 First Bangladeshi American male (superior court): Rahat N. Babar in 2022

Federal judges 
First Hispanic American male (U.S. District Court for the District of New Jersey): Joseph H. Rodriguez (1958) in 1985 
First African American male (U.S. Magistrate Judge of the United States District Court for the District of New Jersey): Michael A. Shipp (1994) in 2007  
First Hispanic American male (Chief Judge; U.S. District Court for the District of New Jersey): Jose L. Linares (1978) in 2017 
First Asian American male (Pakistani descent) federal judge: Zahid Quraishi in 2019

Attorney General of New Jersey 

First African American male: Peter C. Harvey in 2003 
First Sikh American male: Gurbir Grewal (1999) in 2018

New Jersey State Bar Association 

 First Hispanic American male president: Joseph H. Rodriguez (1958) around 1979  
 First openly gay male president: Thomas H. Prol in 2016 
First Latino American male president (New Jersey State Bar Foundation): Norberto A. Garcia in 2019

Firsts in local history 

 T. Gillis Nutter (1929): First African American male lawyer in Atlantic City, New Jersey [Atlantic County, New Jersey]
 Damon Tyner: First African American male to serve as the prosecutor for Atlantic County, New Jersey (2017)
 Franklin S. Montero: First Latino male judge in Bergenfield, New Jersey [Bergen County, New Jersey]
 Roger Lai: First Asian American male to serve as the President of the Burlington County Bar Association, New Jersey (2014)
 Joseph H. Rodriguez (1958): First Hispanic American male lawyer in Camden, New Jersey [Camden County, New Jersey]
 Jose Velez: First Hispanic American male to serve as a municipal court judge in Vineland (2007) [Cumberland County, New Jersey]
 John J. Dios: First Hispanic American male lawyer in Newark, New Jersey (1949) [Essex County, New Jersey]
 Harry Hazelwood Jr.: First African American male judge in Newark, New Jersey (1958) [Essex County, New Jersey]
 Wilfredo Benitez: First Hispanic American male to serve as a Judge of the Bloomfield Municipal Court (2017) [Essex County, New Jersey]
 Elliott Heard Jr. (1963): First African American male lawyer and judge in Gloucester County, New Jersey
 Ramy Eid: First Egyptian American male to serve as a Jersey City Municipal Judge (2014) and its Chief Judge (2021) [Hudson County, New Jersey]
 Mitchell A. Davis: First African American male lawyer in Trenton, New Jersey [Mercer County, New Jersey]
 Pedro Jimenez: First Hispanic American male judge in Mercer County, New Jersey (2008)
 Travis Francis: First African American male judge in Middlesex County, New Jersey
 David F. Bauman: First Asian American male (Japanese American) judge in Monmouth County, New Jersey (2008)

See also 

 List of first minority male lawyers and judges in the United States

Other topics of interest 

 List of first women lawyers and judges in the United States
 List of first women lawyers and judges in New Jersey

References 

 
Minority, New Jersey, first
Minority, New Jersey, first
Lawyers, Minority, first
New Jersey lawyers
Legal history of New Jersey